The following lists events that happened during 2006 in the United Arab Emirates.

Incumbents
President: Khalifa bin Zayed Al Nahyan 
Prime Minister: Maktoum bin Rashid Al Maktoum (until 4 January), Mohammed bin Rashid Al Maktoum (starting 11 February)

Events

February
 February 26 - The Dubai Ports World controversy continues with Miami-based Eller & Company trying to obtain an injunction in the UK High Court to prevent the sale of P&O to Dubai Ports World.

March
 March 1 - The United States urges the United Arab Emirates to end its boycott of Israel: "The Bush administration said yesterday it is pressing the United Arab Emirates to drop its economic boycott of Israel – a major sticking point in the proposed takeover of key U.S. ports by a UAE-owned firm."

References

 
Years of the 21st century in the United Arab Emirates
United Arab Emirates
United Arab Emirates
2000s in the United Arab Emirates